Don Wilson Varner (25 June 1943 – 7 October 2002) was an American soul singer.  Varner was a baritone who sang both uptempo soul in the northern soul style as well as ballads.

Career
Born in Birmingham, Alabama, Varner grew up in the same neighborhood as Eddie Kendricks co-founder of The Temptations.  Varner moved to Chicago after high school to pursue his music career but returned to Alabama after six years to record in Muscle Shoals. at Rick Hall's FAME Studios.  He wrote songs including "I Keep Holdin' On" for Sam & Dave (with William Crump). Varner also worked with Quin Ivy in Sheffield, Alabama and released several songs including "Masquerade"(1967), "Down in Texas"(1967), and "Tear Stained Face" on the South Camp and Quinvy labels.

Varner did not release many recordings but performed numerous live shows in the South with other major soul performers.  He moved to California in the 1980s and toured as the lead singer of the Johnny Otis Show.  He toured numerous European music festivals in 1985.  In his later, career, he began to record gospel music.  He died in Moreno Valley, California in 2002 of a heart attack at the age of 59.  An album of his music from 1968 to 1974 entitled Finally Go Over! was released posthumously.

References

American soul singers
African-American male singer-songwriters
Musicians from Birmingham, Alabama
1943 births
2002 deaths
People from Ensley, Alabama
20th-century African-American male singers
Singer-songwriters from Alabama